Washington Clark Rutter (May 18, 1854 – May 14, 1912) was an American politician in the state of Washington. He served in the Washington State Senate from 1891 to 1895.

References

Republican Party Washington (state) state senators
1854 births
1912 deaths
19th-century American politicians
Republican Party members of the Washington House of Representatives